Lorna Margaret Breen (October 9, 1970 – April 26, 2020) was an American physician who was the emergency room director at NewYork-Presbyterian Hospital. She died by suicide in 2020, while taking a break with family in Charlottesville, Virginia during the coronavirus pandemic.

Early life 

Breen was born in Charlottesville, Virginia, and raised in Danville, Pennsylvania. She graduated from Wyoming Seminary in 1988. She received a master's degree at Cornell University and attended Medical College of Virginia before doing a residency at Long Island Jewish Medical Center.

Career 
Breen worked in The Allen Hospital at the NewYork-Presbyterian, where during spring of 2020 she treated patients with COVID-19. She contracted the virus herself then went back to work after isolating for a week and a half. On a family break in Charlottesville, Virginia, she died by suicide on April 26, 2020. Her father said: "She was truly in the trenches of the frontline. She tried to do her job, and it killed her [...] Make sure she’s praised as a hero. Because she was, she’s a casualty just as much as anyone else who has died."

Selected works

References

External links 
 , Today

1970 births
2020 deaths
2020 suicides
21st-century American physicians
21st-century American women physicians
American emergency physicians
American women academics
Columbia Medical School faculty
Medical College of Virginia alumni
People from Charlottesville, Virginia
Physicians from New York City
Suicides in Virginia
Wyoming Seminary alumni